Conteville-en-Ternois is a commune in the Pas-de-Calais department in the Hauts-de-France region of France.

Geography
A small farming village located 21 miles (34 km) northwest of Arras on the D88 road.

Population

Places of interest
 The church of St.Nicaise, dating from the fourteenth century.
 The chateau.

See also
Communes of the Pas-de-Calais department

References

Contevilleenternois